New Stuyahok Airport  is a state-owned, public-use airport located one nautical mile (1.85 km) west of the central business district of New Stuyahok, a city in the Dillingham Census Area of the U.S. state of Alaska.  Scheduled airline service to Dillingham Airport is provided by Peninsula Airways (PenAir).

As per Federal Aviation Administration records, this airport had 781 commercial passenger boardings (enplanements) in calendar year 2008, a decrease of 24% from the 1,031 enplanements in 2007. New Stuyahok Airport is included in the FAA's National Plan of Integrated Airport Systems (2009–2013), which categorizes it as a general aviation facility.

Facilities and aircraft 
New Stuyahok Airport has one runway designated 14/32 with a gravel surface measuring 3,281 by 98 feet (1,000 x 30 m).

For the 12-month period ending July 31, 2002, the airport had 950 aircraft operations, an average of 79 per month: 74% general aviation and 26% air taxi.

Airlines and destinations

References

External links 
 

Airports in the Dillingham Census Area, Alaska